Spokoyny (also known as Kutina ) is a stratovolcano in the northern part of the Sredinny Range in Russia's Kamchatka Peninsula. It forms part of the Volcanoes of Kamchatka Unesco world heritage site.

It was active during the early and mid-Holocene. Deposits from five eruptions during this interval have been documented, the last of which took place about 5400 years ago.

See Also
List of volcanoes in Russia

References

 Northernmost Holocene volcanoes of Kamchatka (Sredinny Range) Institute of Volcanology and Seismology, Kamchatka, Russia

Volcanoes of the Kamchatka Peninsula
Stratovolcanoes of Russia
Holocene stratovolcanoes
Holocene Asia